Gary Allen Russell Jr. (born June 5, 1988) is an American professional boxer who held the WBC featherweight title from 2015 to 2022. As of October 2022, he is ranked as the world's seventh best active featherweight by The Ring magazine, fourth by BoxRec, and fifth by the Transnational Boxing Rankings Board.

As an amateur boxer, Russell won a bantamweight bronze medal at the 2005 World Championships. In 2011, he was named Prospect of the Year by The Ring, Sports Illustrated, and ESPN. He is the older brother of boxers Gary Antonio Russell and Gary Antuanne Russell, who compete at bantamweight and welterweight, respectively.

Amateur career and Olympics
Russell's quest for a medal ended prematurely as he missed the Olympic weigh-in hours after losing consciousness in his Olympic Village dorm room.
Gary ended his amateur career with a record of 163-10.

Professional career

Early career
Russell Jr. made his professional debut against Antonio Reyes on January 16, 2009. He amassed a 24–0 record during the next five years, with fourteen of those fights coming by way of stoppage.

On March 20, 2014, the WBO ordered Russell Jr. to face Vasiliy Lomachenko for the vacant featherweight title. As the two sides were unable to come to terms regarding the fight, a purse bid was called, which Golden Boy won with a bid of $1,052,500, while Top Rank bid $1,050,000. The fight took place on 21 June at the StubHub Center in Carson, California. Lomachenko defeated Russell Jr. via twelve-round majority decision to win the vacant WBO featherweight title. Judge Lisa Giampa scored the fight a 114–114 draw, but judges Max DeLuca and Pat Russell scored the fight 116–112 in favour of Lomachenko. The fight averaged 578,000 viewers.

WBC featherweight champion

Russell Jr. vs. González
On January 15, 2015, rumors surfaced that the reigning WBC featherweight champion Jhonny González would make his third title defense against Russell Jr. The title bout was officially announced as the event headliner of a Top Rank card held on March 28, 2015, at the Pearl Concert Theater in Paradise, Nevada. It was broadcast by Showtime domestically in the United States and by Mexico Televisa in Mexico. Russell Jr. entered the second title bout of his career as a slight favorite, with most odds-makers having him as a -175 to -190 betting favorite. He won the fight by a fourth-round technical knockout. Russell Jr. knocked González down twice in the third round, both times with a counter left. He once again knocked González down early on in the fourth round, before forcing referee Tony Weeks to stop the fight with a flurry of unanswered punches. Russell Jr. out-landed his opponent 59 to 14 in total punches, with a higher percentage of accurate shots. He expressed his desire to face Lomachenko in a rematch during the post-fight interview, stating: "I’m back in the gym on Monday, we’re definitely looking to get Lomachenko again".

Russell Jr. vs. Hyland
Russell Jr. was tentatively scheduled to face mandatory title challenger Óscar Escandón in his first title defense, sometime in November of 2015. He was later forced to withdraw, due to injuries suffering in training. Russell Jr. was rescheduled to face Patrick Hyland in his first title defense on April 16, 2016, thirteen months after winning the belt. The title bout was booked as the event headliner of a card that took place at the Mohegan Sun Arena in Montville, Connecticut, and was broadcast by Showtime in United States and Canal Space in Latin America. Russell Jr. entered the bout as an overwhelming -5000 favorite to retain the belt, while Hyland was a +2000 underdog. He justified his role as the betting favorite, winning the fight by a second-round knockout. Hyland was knocked down three times by the 1:33 minute mark of the second round, prompting referee Danny Schiavone to wave the fight off.

Russell Jr. vs. Escandón
Russell Jr. was expected to make his second WBC title defense against the interim featherweight champion Óscar Escandón on February 18 at the U.S Bank Arena in Cincinnati, Ohio. Escandón withdrew from the bout on March 1, after suffering a back injury. Although the fight was initially postponed for April of the same year, Escandón's need for additional recovery time pushed back the fight date until May 27. The venue was likewise changed to the MGM National Harbor in Oxon Hill, Maryland. Russell Jr. once again entered a title defense as the favorite to retain, but a smaller once compared to his previous fight, with most odds-makers having him a -1400 favorite. In front of a crow of 2345 people, Russell Jr. retained the featherweight strap by a seventh-round technical knockout. Russell Jr. dominated the bout from the start, with his most dominant round being the third, in which he dropped Escandón with a right uppercut and which one of the judges scored as a 10–7. He finally stopped Escandón with a right hook to the temple at the 0:59 minute mark of the seventh round, which left him unable to continue fighting. Russell Jr.'s second title defense averaged 481 000 viewers on Showtime, and peaked at 517 000.

Russell Jr. vs. Diaz
On March 13, 2018, the WBC ordered Russell Jr. to make his third title defense against the #1 ranked featherweight contender and mandatory title challenger Joseph Diaz. The pair was given a thirty day negotiation period before a purse bid would be held. The two camps came to a verbal agreement regarding the terms of the fight on April 6. The fight was officially announced on April 10. It was booked to headline the May 19 Showtime card, which took place at the MGM National Harbor in Oxon Hill, Maryland. Russell Jr. justified his role as the betting favorite, winning the fight by unanimous decision, with all three judges scoring the fight 117–111 in his favor. Despite retaining the title by a convincing decision, Russell Jr. was unhappy with his performance, saying: "I was disappointed in my performance because I wasn't planning on going the distance, I hurt the right hand, but I still had to use it because he could not get past my jab".

Russell Jr. vs. Martínez
In March of 2019, rumors surfaced that Russell Jr. would face the former IBF super-bantamweight champion Kiko Martínez in his fourth title defense. The title bout was officially announced on April 20, 2019. Russell Jr. was booked to face Martínez, at the time the #3 ranked WBC featherweight contender, on May 18, 2019, on the undercard of the Deontay Wilder and Dominic Breazeale WBC heavyweight title clash. During a pre-fight interview, Russell Jr. claimed that he tried to arrange a title unification bout with either Carl Frampton or Leo Santa Cruz, which failed to pan out. He voiced his frustration in the same interview, stating: "After this Kiko Martinez fight, if I don’t immediately get Leo Santa Cruz then I am vacating my title and I will be moving up to challenge Miguel Berchelt for his WBC title". Russell Jr. beat Martínez by a fifth-round technical knockout by doctor stoppage, due to a cut above Martínez's left eye. He was leading on all three of the judges' scorecards at the time of the stoppage, and had out-landed Martínez 100 to 40 over the course of the five rounds.

Russell Jr. vs. Nyambayar
On October 23, 2019, at the WBC’s 57th annual convention, Russell Jr. was ordered to make his fifth WBC title defense against the #1 ranked mandatory title challenger Tugstsogt Nyambayar. The fight was booked as the event headliner of a February 8, 2020, Showtime card that took place at the PPL Center in Allentown, Pennsylvania. Just as in all of his title fights, Russell Jr. was seen as the favorite to retain. He won the fight by unanimous decision, with scores of 118–110, 117–111 and 116–112.

Russell Jr. vs. Magsayo
On March 8, 2021, the WBC announced that Russell Jr. had come to terms for a mandatory title defense against the former WBC super bantamweight champion, and #1 ranked featherweight contender, Rey Vargas. Vargas was later forced to withdraw from the fight, as he suffered a leg fracture. On September 21, 2021, the WBC instead ordered Russell Jr. to make his sixth title defense against the #2 ranked featherweight contender and mandatory title challenger Mark Magsayo. The title bout was scheduled as the main event of a Showtime broadcast card, which took place at the Borgata in Atlantic City, New Jersey on January 22, 2022. Russell Jr. had trouble making weight on the first weigh-in, coming in at 126.5 pounds (.5 over the championship limit), although he was able to successfully make weight on the second weigh-in an hour later. He nonetheless entered the bout as the favorite to retain, with most odds-makers having him a -380 favorite. Russell Jr. lost the title by majority decision. Two judges scored the fight 115–113 for Magsayo, while the third judge scored the fight as an even 114–114 draw. Russell Jr. threw far fewer strikes compared to his previous fights, and was out-landed 150 to 69 in total punches and 140 to 58 in power punches. He blamed an undisclosed right arm injury for his decreased volume, saying "I refused to put this fight back, and I fought with one arm".

Professional boxing record

See also
 Notable boxing families

References

External links
 
 Gary Russell Jr. amateur boxing record
 Gary Russell Jr. profile at Premier Boxing Champions
Gary Russell Jr - Profile, News Archive & Current Rankings at Box.Live

1988 births
American male boxers
AIBA World Boxing Championships medalists
African-American boxers
bantamweight boxers
living people
Southpaw boxers
World Boxing Council champions
world featherweight boxing champions